Socialist Aymara Group (in Spanish: Grupo Aymara Socialista) is a political grouping (left-wing indigenist) based amongst the Aymara people that contested the December 2004 municipal elections in Yaco, La Paz Department, Bolivia. Rogelio Cuéllar Borras was elected mayor of Yaco.

Aymara people
Indigenist political parties in South America
Indigenous organisations in Bolivia
Indigenous topics of the Andes
Political parties in Bolivia
Political parties with year of establishment missing
Socialist parties in Bolivia